Motherhood and beauty day is an official holiday in Armenia dedicated to women. While March 8 celebrates all women, April 7 is mother's day. April 7 is the Feast of the Annunciation in the calendar of the Armenian Apostolic Church. It is expected to give presents to one's own mother. Celebrating each woman as beautiful in her own way, mothers are particularly happy to receive flowers.

References

Public holidays in Armenia
April observances